The 2014 Nagrada Ljubljane TT is a one-day women's time trial race held in Slovenia on 6 June 2014. The race had a UCI rating of 1.2.

Results

See also
 2014 in women's road cycling

References

2014 in women's road cycling
Women's road bicycle races
2014 in Slovenian sport